Ligeti Ridge is an undersea ridge in the Southern Ocean. The name was approved by the Advisory Committee for Undersea Features in June 1987.

References

Underwater ridges of the Southern Ocean